Microsoft Japan, officially , is a subsidiary of Microsoft based in Japan. Their headquarters are near to Shinagawa station at Minato-ku district of Tokyo.

History 
In 1978, Kazuhiko Nishi, co-founder of ASCII Publisher, partnered with Bill Gates and founded  as the sole dealer of Microsoft's products in Japan. In 1980, ASCII made 1.2 billion yen of sales from licensing Microsoft BASIC. It was 40 percent of Microsoft's sales, and Nishi became Microsoft's Vice President of Sales for Far East. In 1983, ASCII and Microsoft announced MSX. In 1984, ASCII Microsoft was merged to ASCII.

However, Microsoft founded its own Japan subsidiary,  often shortened to MSKK, and dissolved partnership with ASCII in 1986. It was because Gates wanted Microsoft to go public in the New York Stock Exchange, and also he opposed Nishi and ASCII's diversification. , who was also a member of ASCII, officially became the first president of Microsoft Kabushiki Kaisha. ASCII kept rights of MSX.

In October 1986, Microsoft Japan announced the AX project that was a Japanese computing initiative to allow IBM PCs to handle Japanese text. The AX couldn't break into the Japanese PC market due to its cost and lack of available software.

In October 1990, IBM Japan announced the DOS/V. Furukawa made an appointment with IBM Japan to share the source code of DOS/V. Microsoft Japan supplied the OEM adaptation kit (OAK) of DOS/V for PC manufacturers.

For the Japanese adaptation of Windows 3.1, Microsoft Japan and Ricoh co-developed two Japanese TrueType fonts, MS Gothic and MS Mincho. It took two years, and delayed the release of Japanese Windows 3.1. However, it became the first successful version of Windows in Japan.

In 1998, the Japan Fair Trade Commission informed Microsoft of an unfair trade that Microsoft forced personal computer manufacturers to bundle with Excel and Word against the request of a bundle with Excel and Ichitaro. The company faced another JFTC scrutiny (in midst of European Union actions against Microsoft) when the company was accused of having clauses that hurt the ability of Japanese computer manufacturers to obtain an OEM Windows license in 2004.

Microsoft Japan conducted a trial 4-day work week in summer 2019, granting workers paid leave on Fridays. At the same time it cut the length of most meetings from a full hour to half an hour, and capped attendance at five employees. For the duration of the trial, the company reported a 40% increase in productivity and 23% reduction in electricity costs.

Products

Microsoft Hagaki Studio 
Microsoft Hagaki Studio (マイクロソフト はがきスタジオ, Microsoft Postcard Studio) is a discontinued postcard software for printing nengajo (New Year's Day postcard). The software was released only in Japan from 1997 to 2006. It provided the upgrade path from other competitors such as Fudemame (筆まめ) and Fudeoh (筆王), but Microsoft Hagaki Studio 2007 was the last version of the software.

Events
May 13, 2005 - Yoshihiro Maruyama presented the Xbox 360 to the public.

Sponsorship
From 2004 to 2009 the company sponsored the Microsoft Cup, a knockout rugby football tournament contested by the best Japanese teams from the Top League.

References

External links
 

Microsoft local divisions
Japanese subsidiaries of foreign companies